Sree Narayana Guru College of Advanced Studies, Nattika is a for-profit college in Nattika, Thrissur District of Kerala, India. It was founded in 2014. It is affiliated to the University of Calicut and operates under the Sree Narayana Trust.

History
Sree Narayana Guru College of Advanced Studies, Nattika was founded by the Sree Narayana Trust. The institution was set up in 2014 at Nattika on an off-campus site. The institution only offers self-financing courses under the affiliation of the University of Calicut. The courses initially offered were three undergraduate courses. Later, another undergraduate course and two post-graduate courses were also added to the framework.

Campus
The college campus is situated on a sprawling 5-acre plot nearby to the Sree Narayana College, Nattika. The building was inaugurated in 2015 and the construction of the first and second floor commenced in November 2016. The construction concluded the following December and the building was opened to students and staff on 3 January 2018, and inaugurated by Vellapally Natesan on 30 January 2018. The campus also houses a computer lab. Yearly elections are held to elect student representatives onto particular posts within the college, however, any form of politics is strictly banned within the campus premises.

Courses offered

UG courses
Department of English
BA English Literature with Journalism and Public Administration as complementary subjects

Department of Computer Application
BCA

Department of Commerce
BCom. Finance
BBA Human Resource Management

PG courses
Department of English
MA English Literature

Department of Commerce
MCom. Finance

Co-curricular activities
The institution offers a wide variety of extra co-curricular activities with a mission for students to grow as individuals and develop their own identity. Various clubs exist in the college:
 Nature Club,
 Service Club,
 IT Club,
 Tourism Club,
 Music Club and 
 Film Club.

Students can participate in various zonal sports and arts programmes within the university level.

Admissions
Like all institutions affiliated to the University of Calicut, the college follows the Single Window System (SWS) for admissions to the various undergraduate and post-graduate programmes. Through this Single Window System, eligible candidates can register on the website of the university and select their preferred courses and colleges, thereby starting the admission process.

See also
 Sree Keralavarma College, Thrissur
 St. Thomas College, Thrissur
 Sree Narayana College, Nattika
 Christ College, Irinjalakuda

References

External links
 SNGCAS, Nattika

Universities and colleges in Thrissur district
Educational institutions established in 2013
2013 establishments in Kerala